United Doctors Medical Center (UDMC) is a 250-bed hospital in Quezon City, Philippines. It also hosts a school of nursing. UDMC "pioneered technological advancement in the field of ultrasonography", and offers a number of different diagnostic and screening tests.

References

Hospitals in Quezon City
Buildings and structures in Quezon City